Juan María Uribezubia (4 April 1940 – 14 July 2018) was a Spanish racing cyclist. He rode in the 1964 Tour de France as well as in four editions of the Vuelta a España.

Major results
1961
 1st Stage 1 Volta a Catalunya
 2nd Overall Milk Race
1965
 1st Overall Vuelta a La Rioja
1st Stage 3
1966
 1st Overall Vuelta a Mallorca
1st Stage 3
1969
 1st Stage 4a Volta a Catalunya

References

External links
 

1940 births
2018 deaths
Spanish male cyclists
People from Durangaldea
Sportspeople from Biscay
Cyclists from the Basque Country (autonomous community)